Asarel Medet is an enormous copper extracting and processing factory located at 11 km to the northwest of the town of Panagyurishte in the Pazardzhik Province, Bulgaria. It consists of two main factories: Medet which operates from 1964 and Asarel which began operation in 1989. The number of employees has been greatly reduced since the 1990s from over 5,000 to 2,500.

It extracts over 13 million tons of copper ore every year and produces copper concentrate which is sold to the copper refineries at Pirdop. The ore also contains molybdenum, nickel, gold, silver. During the past several years some €40,000,000 have been invested in environmentally friendly technologies in order to preserve the nature of Sredna Gora in the area relatively untouched.

External links 
 Asarel Medet
 Map of the region

Copper mining companies of Bulgaria
Panagyurishte
Buildings and structures in Pazardzhik Province